Princess Badiya bint Ali (1920–2020) was an Iraqi princess. She was the daughter of Ali, King of Hejaz, and Princess Nafeesa, sister of Crown Prince 'Abd al-Ilah, and the aunt of King Faisal II of Iraq.

Life

She spend her childhood in Mecca. Her father was deposed in 1924, and she followed her family in exile to Iraq, were her uncle had been made king in 1921. 

Her brother 'Abd al-Ilah served as regent of Iraq for their nephew king Faisal II, for whom she and especially her sister Abadiya bint Ali acted as mother figures. 

She married Sharif al-Hussein bin Ali bin Abdullah in 1950. 

In 1958, her brother, sister and the rest of the royal family were murdered in the massacre of the royal family during the 14 July Revolution.  She herself was not killed because she had not been present in the Royal Palace when the massacre took place. She sought refuge in the Saudi Embassy in Baghdad, who arranged a safe flight for her and her spouse and sons to Cairo in Egypt. She settled in Switzerland. 

She published her memoirs, which provides a valuable insight in to the life of the Iraqi royal family.

References

 

20th-century Iraqi women
1920 births
2020 deaths
Iraqi princesses
Iraqi memoirists
20th-century memoirists